The Women's snowboard halfpipe competition at the FIS Freestyle Ski and Snowboarding World Championships 2021 was held on 13 March. A qualification was held on 11 March 2021.

Qualification
The qualification was started on 11 March at 8:45. The eight best snowboarders qualified for the final.

Final
The final was started on 13 March at 13:00.

References

Women's snowboard halfpipe